Knight Nunatak is a lone coastal nunatak  south-southeast of Cape Kinsey and  northeast of Mount Conrad in the Goodman Hills of Antarctica. It was mapped by the United States Geological Survey from surveys and air photos, 1960–63, and was named by the Advisory Committee on Antarctic Names for Melvin W. Knight, U.S. Navy, an Operations Division Yeoman responsible for handling office routine in Washington, D.C., Christchurch, and McMurdo Station during Operation Deep Freeze 1967–70.

References

Nunataks of Oates Land